In computational chemistry and molecular dynamics, the combination rules or combining rules are equations that provide the interaction energy between two dissimilar non-bonded atoms, usually for the part of the potential representing the van der Waals interaction. In the simulation of mixtures, the choice of combining rules can sometimes affect the outcome of the simulation.

Combining rules for the Lennard-Jones potential
The Lennard-Jones Potential is a mathematically simple model for the interaction between a pair of atoms or molecules. One of the most common forms is

where ε is the depth of the potential well, σ is the finite distance at which the inter-particle potential is zero, r is the distance between the particles. The potential reaches a minimum, of depth ε, when r = 21/6σ ≈ 1.122σ.

Lorentz-Berthelot rules
The Lorentz rule was proposed by H. A. Lorentz in 1881:

The Lorentz rule is only analytically correct for hard sphere systems. Intuitively, since  loosely reflect the radii of particle i and j respectively, their averages can be said to be the effective radii between the two particles at which point repulsive interactions become severe.

The Berthelot rule (Daniel Berthelot, 1898) is given by:

.

Physically, this arises from the fact that  is related to the induced dipole interactions between two particles.

These rules are the most widely used and are the default in many molecular simulation packages, but are not without failings.

Waldman-Hagler rules
The Waldman-Hagler rules are given by:

and

Fender-Halsey
The Fender-Halsey combining rule is given by

Kong rules
The Kong rules for the Lennard-Jones potential are given by:

Others
Many others have been proposed, including those of Tang and Toennies 
Pena, Hudson and McCoubrey and Sikora (1970).

Combining rules for other potentials

Good-Hope rule
The Good-Hope rule for Mie–Lennard‐Jones or Buckingham potentials is given by:

Hogervorst rules
The Hogervorst rules for the Exp-6 potential are:

and

Kong-Chakrabarty  rules
The Kong-Chakrabarty rules for the Exp-6 potential are:

and

Other rules for that have been proposed for the Exp-6 potential are the Mason-Rice rules and the Srivastava and Srivastava rules (1956).

Equations of state
Industrial equations of state have similar mixing and combining rules.  These include the van der Waals one-fluid mixing rules

and the van der Waals combining rule, which introduces a binary interaction parameter ,

.

There is also the Huron-Vidal mixing rule, and the more complex Wong-Sandler mixing rule, which equates excess Helmholtz free energy at infinite pressure between an equation of state and an activity coefficient model (and thus with liquid excess Gibbs free energy).

References

Intermolecular forces
Computational chemistry
Theoretical chemistry
Potentials
Molecular dynamics
Molecular modelling